Taleggio is a comune (municipality) in the Province of Bergamo in the Italian region of Lombardy, located about  northeast of Milan and about  northwest of Bergamo.

The municipality of Taleggio contains the frazioni (subdivisions, mainly villages and hamlets) Olda, Peghera, Sottochiesa and Pizzino.

Taleggio borders the following municipalities: Camerata Cornello, Cassiglio, Fuipiano Valle Imagna, Gerosa, Moggio, San Giovanni Bianco, Vedeseta.

Demographic evolution

References